The 2018 Tashkent Open was a WTA International tennis tournament played on outdoor hard courts. It was the 20th edition of the Tashkent Open, on the 2018 WTA Tour. It took place at the Olympic Tennis School in Tashkent, Uzbekistan, between September 24 and 29, 2018.

Points and prize money

Point distribution

Prize money

1 Qualifiers prize money is also the Round of 32 prize money
* per team

Singles main-draw entrants

Seeds 

 1 Rankings as of September 17, 2017

Other entrants 
The following players received wildcards into the singles main draw:
  Nigina Abduraimova
  Anna Kalinskaya 
  Vera Zvonareva

The following players received entry using protected rankings:
  Margarita Gasparyan
  Bojana Jovanovski Petrović

The following players received entry from the qualifying draw:
  Ivana Jorović 
  Anastasia Potapova
  Dejana Radanović 
  Fanny Stollár

Withdrawals 
  Vitalia Diatchenko → replaced by  Marta Kostyuk
  Pauline Parmentier → replaced by  Nao Hibino

Doubles main-draw entrants

Seeds 

1 Rankings as of September 17, 2017

Other entrants 
The following pairs received wildcards into the doubles main draw:
 Nigina Abduraimova /  Anna Kalinskaya 
 Akgul Amanmuradova /  Eugenie Bouchard

Champions

Singles 

  Margarita Gasparyan def.  Anastasia Potapova 6–2, 6–1

Doubles 

  Olga Danilović /  Tamara Zidanšek def.  Irina-Camelia Begu /  Raluca Olaru, 7–5, 6–3

External links 
 

 
2018
2018 in Uzbekistani sport
Tashkent Open
Tashkent Open